Tessellarctia is a genus of moths in the family Erebidae.

Species
 Tessellarctia semivaria Walker, 1856
 Tessellarctia walterei Beutelspacher, 1984

References

Natural History Museum Lepidoptera generic names catalog

Phaegopterina
Moth genera